The Adamawa State College of Education is a state government higher education institution located in Hong, Adamawa State, Nigeria. It is affiliated to Ahmadu Bello University for its degree programmes. The current Provost is Johnson Pongri.

History 
The Adamawa State College of Education was established in 1970.

Courses 
The institution offers the following courses;

 Biology Education
 Physical And Health Education
 Christian Religious Studies
 Fine And Applied Arts
 Education and Social Studies
 Education and English
 Chemistry Education
 Geography
 History
 French
 Islamic Studies
 Home Economics
 Primary Education Studies
 Arabic
 Agricultural Science and Education
 Education and Mathematics
 Integrated Science
 Hausa

Affiliation 
The institution is affiliated with the Ahmadu Bello University to offer programmes leading to Bachelor of Education, (B.Ed.) in;

References 

Universities and colleges in Nigeria
1970 establishments in Nigeria